Audio & Design (Recording) Ltd are an English based company who specialised in the development and production of professional audio processors, in the form of limiters, compressors, expanders & equalisers. The company were one of the first to introduce Field-effect transistors into a commercially available limiter amplifier in 1966. Audio & Design (Recording) equipment has been widely used by professional studios, music artists and the broadcasting industry throughout the world. Recently the company has installed and serviced the BBC World Service's multi Terabyte archive installation using Storage area network technology (SAN).

Notable Products

F760X-RS 'Compex' Limiter
The F760X 'Compex' limiter was made up of three main parts; a compressor, limiter and a 'noise reducing' expander/gate. All of these parts could be used separately or together for well controlled sound limiting. This combination came about from client feedback. From the feedback ADR designed and built the first units, these were labelled as F760X-RS (RS meaning rack-mount stereo). Later modifications were made and another version was released with a better, ergonomically designed, front panel. This later model was labelled as the 'Compex'.
The 'Compex' limiter provided peak limiting with a multi-ratio, variable threshold compressor. Ratio settings ranged from 1:1 to 20:1  and there were controls for threshold and release time. The inclusion of an expander/gate provided attenuation of the gain during pauses in the audio signal to reduce noise caused by compression; the expander/gate could also be used for special 'punchy' effects, favoured on drum and percussive sounds. Noise gates were often criticised at the time for 'hunting' around the threshold point. The 'Compex' used clever hysteresis around the gate, this was important to stop unpredictable opening and closing of the gate; the open threshold was higher than the close threshold.

The gain reduction controlled by the 'Compex' was monitored from two meters located to the right of the front panel. There were two light indicators; a red light lit when the signal level reached its peak, and when in expand mode a green light was lit. There were a set of lights for each channel, depending if the unit was the stereo or mono version.

There were some different models of the 'Compex' available; one of these included a smaller console module named the F760-N. This version was built without the expander/gate, it later had an expander/gate added and was then known as the F760X-N. 

There is also a rare version called F760X-RS/T. One of the visible differences are the VU-meters, which got the brand "Audio & Design Recording LTD." and if one looks on the rear, there one can see the type.

The "T" stands for transformer, which are said to add harmonics to the sound. The "T" version was mainly used in broadcasting stations, mainly because of its SNR and headroom. ADR also built an F760 version for the Helios mixing consoles.

Scamp Rack
Scamp stood for (Standardised Compatible Audio Modular Package). The system embodied the card-module concept within a standard racking frame. Although employing no specifically new techniques the design offered dramatic savings in packaging costs without degradation in performance standard. The rack was designed to be configured to different types of recording sessions using different types of modules. The rack could hold seventeen one inch modules all powered from the rack itself by use of an external power supply. A half-width rack with integrated power supply which could hold six modules was also available.

Below is a list of the modules that were available.

External links
 Official Company Website

Footnotes

Music equipment manufacturers